Leptecophylla tameiameiae, known as  or  in the Hawaiian language, is a species of flowering plant that is native to the Hawaiian and Marquesas Islands. 
The specific epithet honors King Kamehameha I, who formed the Kingdom of Hawaii. Its small needle-like leaves are whitish underneath, dark green above. The round berries range in color from white through shades of pink to red.

Ecology
 is a hardy, adaptive, and morphologically variable plant that occupies a variety of ecosystems, from dry forest up to alpine bogs and shrublands. Despite being common, it is difficult to propagate, taking months to years for seeds to germinate and growing very slowly.

The  and other birds eat the berries of this shrub and thus distribute it.

Human Uses

References

External links

Epacridoideae
Plants described in 1867
Trees of Hawaii
Flora of French Polynesia